Edo Buma (born 31 March 1946) is a retired field hockey player from the Netherlands. He competed  at the 1968 Summer Olympics, where his team finished in fifth place. His son Jaap-Derk Buma won an Olympic gold medal in field hockey in 2000.

References

External links
 

1946 births
Living people
Dutch male field hockey players
Field hockey players at the 1968 Summer Olympics
Olympic field hockey players of the Netherlands
Sportspeople from Enschede
HC Klein Zwitserland players